United Nations Security Council Resolution 32, adopted on August 26, 1947, condemned the continuing violence in the Indonesian National Revolution and asked both sides (the Netherlands and Indonesian Republicans) to own up to their commitments under United Nations Security Council Resolution 30.

The resolution was adopted by ten votes to none, with the United Kingdom abstaining.

See also
List of United Nations Security Council Resolutions 1 to 100 (1946–1953)

References
Text of the Resolution at undocs.org

External links
 

 0032
Indonesian National Revolution
 0032
 0032
1947 in Indonesia
1947 in the Netherlands
August 1947 events